Asian Radio was a Bangladeshi Bengali-language radio station broadcast on FM radio. It was based in Dhaka, and was a sister network to Asian TV. It began broadcasting on 18 January 2013. It commenced official transmissions on 23 September 2013. The station was later shut down.

Notable Programs
Some notable programs of the radio channel are:
 Bidyasagor Chatrabas
 Looking for Bou
 Sokha Tumi Kar
 Telesmati
 The Mama Show

References

2013 establishments in Bangladesh
Organisations based in Dhaka
Radio stations in Bangladesh
Mass media in Dhaka